The list of ship launches in 1886 includes a chronological list of some ships launched in 1886.



References

Sources
 

1886
Ship launches